Alan Douglas Cox (born 6 August 1970) is an English actor. He portrayed a teenage Dr. Watson in Young Sherlock Holmes in 1985.

Life and career
Cox was born in Westminster, London, and is the son of Scottish Emmy Award-winning actor Brian Cox and his first wife, actress Caroline Burt. Cox was educated at St Paul's School in London. He has a sister, Margaret, and two half brothers Orson Jonathan Cox and Torin Kamran Cox.

Cox portrayed the young John Mortimer the 1982 TV adaptation of his play A Voyage Round My Father, starring opposite Laurence Olivier. He is probably most widely known for his role in Young Sherlock Holmes (1985), where he played a teenage version of Dr. Watson. Other films include An Awfully Big Adventure (1995), Mrs. Dalloway (1997), and The Auteur Theory (1999). In 2011, Cox also co-starred as a nudist named Cory Beck in the independent comedy Act Naturally.

Filmography

Film
{| class="wikitable"
!Year
!Title
!Role
!Notes
|-
| 1976
| A Divorce
| Jason
| TV film
|-
| 1981
| If You Go Down in the Woods Today
| Cub Scout
|
|-
| rowspan="2"|1982
| A Voyage Round My Father
| Son as a Boy
| TV film
|-
| East Lynne
| William Carlyle
| TV film
|-
| 1984
| Man of Letters
| Kenton
| TV film
|-
| 1985
| Young Sherlock Holmes
| John Watson
| 
|-
| 1995
| An Awfully Big Adventure
| Geoffrey
|
|-
| 1997
| Mrs Dalloway
| Young Peter
|
|-
| 1999
| The Auteur Theory| George Sand
|
|-
| rowspan="2"|2000
| Cor, Blimey!| Orsino
| TV film
|-
| Weight| Henry Salmon
|
|-
| rowspan="2"|2002
| Die Wasserfälle von Slunj| Donald Clayton
| TV film
|-
| The Dinosaur Hunters| Richard Owen
| TV film
|-
| 2003
| Justice| Palm Sunday
|
|-
| rowspan="2"|2004
| Ladies in Lavender| Obsequious Man
|
|-
| Not Only But Always| Alan Bennett
| TV film
|-
| rowspan="2"|2006
| Elizabeth David: A Life in Recipes| Cuthbert
| TV film
|-
| Housewife, 49| Dennis
| TV film
|-
| 2008
| August| Barton
|
|-
| 2009
| Margaret| Gordon Reece
| TV film
|-
| 2010
| The Nutcracker in 3D| Gielgud
| Voice role
|-
| rowspan="2"|2011
| Act Naturally| Cory Beck
|
|-
| The Speed of Thought| Alexei
|
|-
| 2012
| The Dictator| BP Executive
|
|-
| rowspan="2"|2018
| Staging the Knack and How to Get It| Interviewer
| Short film
|-
| Say My Name| Father Donald Davies
|
|-
| 2019
| Act Super Naturally| Cory Beck
|
|-
|}

Television

Bibliography
 Holmstrom, John. The Moving Picture Boy: An International Encyclopaedia from 1895 to 1995''. Norwich, Michael Russell, 1996, p. 381.

References

External links

1970 births
English male child actors
English male television actors
Living people
English people of Irish descent
English people of Scottish descent
Male actors from London
People from Westminster
English male film actors
People educated at St Paul's School, London
20th-century English male actors
21st-century English male actors